David Laro (1942 – September 21, 2018) was an American senior judge of the United States Tax Court.

Laro graduated from the University of Michigan in 1964, earned a Juris Doctor from the University of Illinois Law School in 1967 and a Master of Laws in Taxation from New York University Law School in 1970.

He was admitted to Michigan Bar, and United States District Court (Eastern District) in 1968. He was a partner in the law firm of Winegarden, Booth, Shedd, and Laro from 1970–75; member of the law firm of Laro and Borgeson from 1975–86; and a solo practitioner from 1986-92.

Laro was appointed by President George H. W. Bush as Judge, United States Tax Court, on November 2, 1992, for a term ending November 1, 2007. Following the end of this term, he continued to serve as a senior judge on the court. He died on September 21, 2018.

International taxation work
At the request of the American Bar Association and the Central and Eastern European Law Initiative, Laro contributed written comments on the Draft Laws of Ukraine and Uzbekistan and on the creation of specialized courts in Eastern Europe. As a consultant for Harvard University (Harvard Institute for International Development), and Georgia State University, he lectured in Moscow to Russian judges on the subject of tax reform and litigation procedures in May 1997 and December 1998. Laro is a commentator for the American Bar Association's Central and East European Law Initiative on the draft laws of Uzbekistan, Kazakhstan, Slovakia, Ukraine, and the Republic of Macedonia. He has lectured to Judges and tax officials in Azerbaijan on tax reform.

Other activities
Counsel to Dykema Gossett, Ann Arbor, MI, 1989–90
President and chief executive officer of Durakon Industries, Inc., 1989–91
Chairman, Board of Durakon Industries, Inc., 1991–92
Chairman, Board of Republic Bank, 1986–92
Vice Chairman and Co-Founder of Republic Bancorp, Inc. 1986-92
Regent, University of Michigan Board of Regents, 1975–81
Member, Michigan State Board of Education, 1982–83
Chairman, Michigan State Tenure Commission, 1972–75
Commissioner, Civil Service Commission, Flint, MI, 1984–85
Commissioner of Police, Flint, 1972–74
Member, Political Leadership Program, Institute of Public Policy and Social Research
Member, Ann Arbor Art Association Board of Directors
Member, Holocaust Foundation (Ann Arbor)
Adjunct professor of law, Georgetown University Law School
Instructor, National Institute for Trial Advocacy
Visiting professor, University of San Diego Law School
Member, National Advisory Committee for New York University Law School.

Attribution
Material on this page was copied from the website of the United States Tax Court, which is published by a United States government agency, and is therefore in the public domain.

References

1942 births
2018 deaths
Judges of the United States Tax Court
United States Article I federal judges appointed by George H. W. Bush
20th-century American judges
Regents of the University of Michigan
University of Michigan alumni
People from Michigan
21st-century American judges
Harvard Institute for International Development